Granulifusus is a genus of sea snails, marine gastropod mollusks in the subfamily Fusininae of the family Fasciolariidae, the spindle snails, the tulip snails and their allies.

Species
Species within the genus Granulifusus include:
 Granulifusus amoenus Hadorn & Fraussen, 2005
 Granulifusus annae Kantor, Fedosov, Snyder & Bouchet, 2018
 Granulifusus babae Hadorn & Fraussen, 2005
 Granulifusus bacciballus Hadorn & Fraussen, 2005
 Granulifusus balbus Hadorn & Fraussen, 2005
 Granulifusus benjamini Hadorn & Fraussen, 2005
 Granulifusus captivus (Smith, 1889)
 Granulifusus consimilis Garrard, 1966
 Granulifusus dalli (Watson, 1882) 
 Granulifusus discrepans (Kuroda & Habe, 1961)
 Granulifusus dondani M.A. Snyder, 2003
 Granulifusus faurei (Barnard, 1959)
 Granulifusus geometricus Hadorn & Fraussen, 2005
 Granulifusus guidoi Kantor, Fedosov, Snyder & Bouchet, 2018
 Granulifusus hayashii Habe, 1961
 Granulifusus jeanpierrevezzaroi (Cossignani, 2017)
 Granulifusus kiranus Shuto, 1958
 Granulifusus kurodai (Okutani & Sakurai, 1964)
 Granulifusus lochi Hadorn & Fraussen, 2005
 Granulifusus martinorum Cernohorsky, 1987
 Granulifusus monsecourorum Hadorn & Fraussen, 2005
 † Granulifusus musasiensis (Makiyama, 1922)
 † Granulifusus nakasiensis Hadorn & Fraussen, 2005
 Granulifusus niponicus (E.A. Smith, 1879)
 Granulifusus noguchii (Habe & Masuda, 1990) 
 Granulifusus norfolkensis Kantor, Fedosov, Snyder & Bouchet, 2018
 Granulifusus obesus Snyder, 2013
 Granulifusus poppei Delsaerdt, 1995
 Granulifusus pulchellus Hadorn & Chino, 2005
 Granulifusus rubrolineatus (G.B. Sowerby II, 1870)
 Granulifusus rufinodis (von Martens, 1901)
 Granulifusus staminatus (Garrard, 1966) 
 Granulifusus tatianae Kantor, Fedosov, Snyder & Bouchet, 2018
 Granulifusus vermeiji M.A. Snyder, 2003
 Granulifusus westhuizeni Lussi, 2014
 Granulifusus williami (Poppe & Tagaro, 2006)
Species brought into synonymy
 Granulifusus libratus (Watson, 1886): synonym of Granulifusus dalli (Watson, 1882)
 Granulifusus simplex (E.A. Smith, 1879) accepted as "Fusinus pauciliratus complex" Snyder, 2000
 Granulifusus suboblitus (Pilsbry, 1904): synonym of Granulifusus niponicus (E.A. Smith, 1879)

References

 Kuroda T. & Habe T. (1954). New genera of Japanese marine gastropods. Venus. 18(2): 84-97.
 Hadorn R. & Fraussen K. 2005. Revision of the genus Granulifusus Kuroda & Habe 1954 with description of some new species (Gastropoda: Prosobranchia: Fasciolariidae). Archiv für Molluskenkunde 134 (2): 129-171

External links
 Kantor Y.I., Fedosov A.E., Snyder M.A. & Bouchet P. (2018). Pseudolatirus Bellardi, 1884 revisited, with the description of two new genera and five new species (Neogastropoda: Fasciolariidae). European Journal of Taxonomy. 433: 1-57